Isar I and Isar II are two base load nuclear power plants which have been built in Germany next to the Isar river.  They are fourteen kilometres away from Landshut, between Essenbach and Niederaichbach.

Safety

Passive safety features

The safety feature begins with the passive safety feature which includes the radioactive materials in the reactor core (also by accidents) to protect them from the outside environment. Fuel pellets, fuel rod casings, reactor pressure vessel, biological shield, steel containment structure and the outer ferro concrete mantle are six of the most important passive safety features.

Active safety features
The passive safety installations are supplemented by a lot of automatically working active safety systems whose reliableness is based on their plural existence and their autonomously working in separate rooms. This is as necessary for the internal electric power supply as for the reactor cooling system, which guarantees the reliable thermal dissipation in every operating status, even when an implausible accident ingresses (for example a break of a primary coolant line). It constantly controls and compares all the important key operating parameters of the plant and activates automatically the necessary protection measures (independent from the plant operating personnel) if a parameter reaches a limit value. For example, the protection system may initiate a rapid shutdown and aftercooling procedure.

The future

On-site storage facilities

By law, all German nuclear power plants are forced to store their atomic waste in on-site storage facilities near the power plant. These temporary storage facilities have to be used until a final processing plant is built in a central location in Germany, to where all nuclear power plants will send their atomic waste. The usage of this storage is planned from 2030 onwards, so interim storage facilities are necessary.

The nuclear power plants Isar must also therefore have its own temporary storage facility, which has been under construction since 15 June 2004.

Work on the temporary storage facility at the Isar location was marked by protest actions from environmentalist and resident groups, which voiced concern about possible health effects.

The interim storage facility of Isar nuclear power plant is in use since 2007 and provides capacity for 152 fuel element containers.

Phasing-out of nuclear power

Concerns for the safety of nuclear power production were greatly increased after the Chernobyl accident in 1986, eventually leading to plans for its phase-out in certain countries. According to German Nuclear Phase-out regulations, Isar-I was to be shut down in 2011, with operations in Isar-II continuing until 2021. After the March 2011 Tōhoku earthquake and tsunami in Japan, however, the decision was made to expedite shutdown. Isar-I was closed as of 17 March 2011 for a three-month moratorium on nuclear power the result of that moratorium announced in the early hours of 30 May 2011 was that Isar-I would not return. Isar-II, being one of the strongest (ca. 1,400 MW) and most modern reactors in Germany, is supposed to run until the end of the phase-out (2022).

References

External links

E.ON Nuclear Energy

Buildings and structures in Bavaria
Nuclear power stations in Germany